Strathmore is a settlement in inland Taranaki, in the western North Island of New Zealand.

References

Further reading

Stratford District, New Zealand
Populated places in Taranaki